Grand Point North is an annual two-day music festival founded by Grace Potter & The Nocturnals, produced by Grace Potter and Higher Ground Presents, and held at Waterfront Park in Burlington, Vermont.  The last festival took place in 2019.

The festival was first held in 2011 and typically takes place over a weekend in mid-September.  The performers alternate on two side-by-side stages, allowing for continuous performances with no overlap. Potter performs both nights, usually as the headliner, and the festival has attracted national artists such as The Avett Brothers, Gov't Mule, Trombone Shorty & Orleans Avenue, Lake Street Dive, The Flaming Lips, Old Crow Medicine Show, Guster, Trey Anastasio Band, Jackson Browne, and Nathaniel Rateliff & The Night Sweats.   

There is an emphasis on local acts from Vermont, especially the Burlington area.  Since 2013, the festival has partnered with Seven Days to give fans a chance to choose a Vermont musician or band to perform at the festival.  The festival features Grand Point Local, a celebration of local Vermont restaurants and food products organized by the Skinny Pancake, and Grand Point Weird, an art installation curated by Grace's sister Charlotte.  An official afterparty is often held at a nearby venue after one or both nights; these late-night shows can involve performers from the main festival lineup.

The 2020 and 2021 festivals were both cancelled due to the COVID-19 pandemic.  In June 2022, Higher Ground co-founder Alex Crothers stated the festival would not be returning that year, and the possibility of a return in future years is uncertain.

Lineups and schedule

2011 
The inaugural festival was held in August.  Beginning the following year, it would be held in September. Kenny Chesney made a surprise appearance and performed with the Nocturnals.

2012
The lineup for 2012 was announced on May 1.  That year's festival was held on Friday and Saturday; every other year it would be held on Saturday and Sunday.  Phish keyboardist Page McConnell joined the Nocturnals on Saturday night for a guest appearance.

2013
The lineup for 2013 was announced on May 14. Kenny Chesney joined the Nocturnals on Saturday night for a surprise guest appearance.

2014
The lineup for 2014 was announced on April 22.

2015
The lineup for 2015 was announced on April 29.  Potter released her solo album Midnight in August and was billed solo for the first time, although her band included Nocturnals members Benny Yurco and Matt Burr.  Kenny Chesney again made a surprise appearance on Sunday night.

2016
The lineup for 2016 was announced on April 14.  Basia Bulat was originally scheduled to perform on Sunday but had to cancel the night before; she was replaced by River Whyless, who had performed at the official after party on Saturday.  This festival featured free yoga classes for the first time.

2017
The lineup for 2017 was announced on April 26. The Trey Anastasio Band, performing in Burlington for the first time since 2011, was the headliner on Sunday night.  This was the first (and to date only) time that the headliner at Grand Point North was not Grace Potter or her former band, the Nocturnals.  Anastasio's set featured many guest appearances by former members of his band and Phish.

2018
The lineup for 2018 was announced on May 23, with Jackson Browne and Ani DiFranco being announced later, on June 25. Greg Holden was originally announced, but was not on the final schedule.  Ariel Zevon, Warren Zevon's daughter and Jackson Browne's goddaughter, performed with Browne during his set.  Sen. Bernie Sanders introduced Potter on Saturday, and Kenny Chesney made another guest appearance to perform with Potter.

2019
The lineup for 2019 was announced on June 13. On July 15, Gov't Mule was announced, along with a special set from Potter and Warren Haynes.

Notes

References

External links

 Official website

Music festivals in Vermont
Music of Vermont